Knott Arena is a multi-purpose sports arena at Mount Saint Mary's University, in Emmitsburg, Maryland. It was built in 1987 and is home to the Mount St. Mary's Mountaineers men's basketball team.  It features a main arena/convocation center with a seating capacity of 3,500 for basketball.  For other events, the arena can seat up to 5,000.

See also
 List of NCAA Division I basketball arenas

References

Mount St. Mary's Mountaineers men's basketball
College basketball venues in the United States
Basketball venues in Maryland